The 2001–02 AHL season was the 66th season of the American Hockey League. It was the season of the biggest growth in the AHL's history, as it accepted eight new teams. The demise of the International Hockey League brought six teams transferring from the defunct league, in addition to two expansion teams.

The AHL realigned divisions again. The Eastern conference consisted of the East, North and Canadian divisions. The Western conference consisted of the Central, South and West divisions. The league also announced three additional trophies, two of which were awarded for the regular season champions of the new divisions. The Norman R. "Bud" Poile Trophy went to the West division, and the Emile Francis Trophy went to the North division. The third trophy, the Michael Condon Memorial Award was first awarded for outstanding service by an on-ice official in the AHL.

Twenty-seven teams played 80 games each in the schedule. The Bridgeport Sound Tigers finished first overall in the regular season. The Chicago Wolves won their first Calder Cup championship, in their inaugural AHL season.

Team changes
 The Louisville Panthers suspend operations, becoming dormant.
 The Kentucky Thoroughblades move to Cleveland, Ohio, becoming the second incarnation of the Cleveland Barons.
 The Bridgeport Sound Tigers join the AHL as an expansion team, based in Bridgeport, Connecticut.
 The Manchester Monarchs join the AHL as an expansion team, based in Manchester, New Hampshire.
Teams from the International Hockey League
Six teams transferred to the American Hockey League, when the International Hockey League ceased operations.
 The Chicago Wolves based in Rosemont, Illinois.
 The Grand Rapids Griffins based in Grand Rapids, Michigan.
 The Houston Aeros based in Houston, Texas.
 The Manitoba Moose based in Winnipeg, Manitoba.
 The Milwaukee Admirals based in Milwaukee, Wisconsin.
 The Utah Grizzlies based in Salt Lake City, Utah.

Final standings
Note: GP = Games played; W = Wins; L = Losses; T = Ties; OTL = Overtime losses; GF = Goals for; GA = Goals against; Pts = Points;

Eastern Conference

Western Conference

Scoring leadersNote: GP = Games played; G = Goals; A = Assists; Pts = Points; PIM = Penalty minutes''

 complete list

Calder Cup Playoffs

Note: Pairings are re-seeded after each of the first two rounds.

All Star Classic
The 15th AHL All-Star Game was played on February 14, 2002 at the Mile One Stadium in St. John's, Newfoundland and Labrador. Team Canada defeated Team PlanetUSA 13-11. In the skills competition held the day before the All-Star Game, Team Canada won 21-9 over Team PlanetUSA.

Trophy and award winners

Team awards

Individual Awards

Other awards

See also
List of AHL seasons

References
AHL official site
AHL Hall of Fame
HockeyDB

 
American Hockey League seasons
2
2